Justiciability concerns the limits upon legal issues over which a court can exercise its judicial authority. It includes, but is not limited to, the legal concept of standing, which is used to determine if the party bringing the suit is a party appropriate to establishing whether an actual adversarial issue exists. Essentially, justiciability seeks to address whether a court possesses the ability to provide adequate resolution of the dispute; where a court believes that it cannot offer such a final determination, the matter is not justiciable.

In the United States

Federal courts 
Justiciability is one of several criteria that the United States Supreme Court uses to make a judgment granting writ of certiorari ("cert."). 

For an issue to be justiciable by a United States federal court, all of the following conditions must be met: 

 The parties must not be seeking an advisory opinion. 
 There must be an actual controversy between the parties, meaning that the parties cannot agree to a lawsuit where all parties seek the same particular judgment from the court (known as a collusive suit or friendly suit); rather, the parties must each be seeking a different outcome.
 The question must be neither unripe nor moot.
An unripe question is one for which there is not yet at least a threatened injury to the plaintiff, or where the available judicial alternatives have not all been exhausted.
A moot question is one for which the potential for an injury to occur has ceased to exist, or where the injury has been removed. However, if the issue is likely to reoccur, yet will continually become moot before any challenge can reach a court of competent jurisdiction ("capable of repetition, yet evading review"), courts may allow a case that is moot to be litigated.
 The suit must not be seeking judgment upon a political question.
 Political questions involve matters where there is:
 "a textually demonstrable constitutional commitment of the issue to a coordinate political department" (meaning that the U.S. Constitution requires another branch of government to resolve questions regarding the issue);
 "a lack of judicially discoverable and manageable standards for resolving it";
 an "impossibility of deciding [a matter] without an initial policy determination of a kind clearly for nonjudicial discretion";
 an "impossibility of a court's undertaking independent resolution without expressing lack of the respect due coordinate branches of government";
 "an unusual need for unquestioning adherence to a political decision already made"; or
 a "potentiality of embarrassment from multifarious pronouncements by various departments on one question."
 Political questions include such issues as whether the nation is "at war" with another country, or whether the U.S. Senate has properly "tried" an impeached federal officer.

If the case fails to meet any one of these requirements, the court cannot hear it.

State courts 
State courts tend to require a similar set of circumstances, although some states permit their courts to give advisory opinions on questions of law, even though there may be no actual dispute between parties to resolve. Unlike federal courts with limited jurisdiction, state courts are not bound by the “case or controversy” clause of Art. III, Section 2 of the U.S. Constitution. Federal courts' decisions on mootness, advisory opinions, and related matters may be considered and even found persuasive, depending on the state's laws, but are not controlling.

Under the "ministerial exception" based on the First Amendment, courts decline to hear defamation, employment and other actions founded on statements or beliefs that necessarily implicate the truth or falsity of religious doctrine.

In the United Kingdom
The issue of non-justiciability has been recognized in Buttes Gas and Oil Co. v Hammer, where Lord Wilberforce stated that the principle "that the courts will not adjudicate upon the transactions of foreign sovereign states" is not a matter of discretion, but is "inherent in the nature of the judicial process". The principle was further developed in Kuwait Airways Corp. v Iraqi Airways Co..

References 

United States administrative law